BMM may refer to:
Bachelor in Mass Media, a college degree
Bandhua Mukti Morcha, an Indian non-governmental organization
Baptist Mid-Missions, a Baptist mission agency
 Beneficial Microbes Museum and Tourism Factory, a museum in Yilan County, Taiwan
Biker Mice from Mars
Biomimetic materials
 Birmingham, Michigan (Amtrak station), United States Amtrak station code
Böhmisch-Mährische Maschinenfabrik AG (BMM) successor company to ČKD (Českomoravská Kolben-Daněk)
Brigade Mixte Mobile, a Cameroonian paramilitary secret police
Business Motivation Model